The Boonton Historic District is a  historic district along Main, Church, Birch, Cornelia, and Cedar Streets in the town of Boonton in Morris County, New Jersey. It was added to the National Register of Historic Places on September 29, 1980, for its significance in architecture. The district has 22 contributing buildings, including the Boonton Public Library, which was previously listed individually on the NRHP.

History and description
The development of Boonton began with the construction of the Morris Canal along the Rockaway River from 1829 to 1830. The New Jersey Iron Company was organized and bought  of land here to construct an ironworks and company town. The district encompasses a residential section of the town and includes buildings that show the architectural changes from 1830 to 1890. In 1833, three houses had been built on Church Street, one of the first streets running uphill from Main Street. The public library was built  and features Greek Revival architecture. The Garret Rickards House, at 211 Cornelia Street, is one of two octagon houses in the district. It was built  based on the designs by Orson Squire Fowler and shows Italianate style. The First Presbyterian Church on the corner of Church and Birch Streets was built 1859–1860 and features Greek Revival and Gothic Revival styles. St. John's Episcopal Church on Cornelia Street was designed by architect Richard Upjohn. It was built in 1863 with Carpenter Gothic style.  The other octagon house, the Nathaniel Myers House, at 224 Cornelia Street, also built c.1854, was acquired by St. John's Episcopal to serve as a rectory.

See also
 National Register of Historic Places listings in Morris County, New Jersey
 List of octagon houses
 Boonton Historical Society and Museum

References

External links
 
 
 

Boonton, New Jersey	
National Register of Historic Places in Morris County, New Jersey
Historic districts on the National Register of Historic Places in New Jersey
New Jersey Register of Historic Places
Greek Revival architecture in New Jersey
Gothic Revival architecture in New Jersey
Italianate architecture in New Jersey